"Ililigtas Ka Niya" is a song recorded by Filipino singer Gary Valenciano. The song was released on September 26, 2018 for the soundtrack of FPJ's Ang Probinsyano.

Other versions
In 2020, ABS-CBN singers sang the song for the people who battles the COVID-19.

References

2018 songs
Tagalog-language songs